Réamonn Ó Gallchobhair (aka Redmond O'Gallagher) was an Irish bishop in the mid 16th century.

Ó Gallchobhair was appointed Bishop of Killala by Pope Paul III on 6 November 1545. He was translated to the Roman Catholic see of Derry  by Pope Pius V on 22 June 1569.

References

Bishops of Killala and Achonry
16th-century Roman Catholic bishops in Ireland
Roman Catholic bishops of Derry